The following is a list of transfers for the 2007 Primera División de Chile season.

Apertura

Antofagasta

In:
  Pedro Reyes Transferred from  Unión Española
  Cristián Reynero Transferred from  Huachipato
  Alejandro Vasquez Transferred from  Everton
  Carlos Ortega Transferred from  Cobreloa
  Raúl Palacios Transferred from  La Serena
  Roberto Castillo Transferred from  Everton
  Maximiliano Estévez Transferred from  Estudiantes de Mérida FC
  Alejandro Osorio Transferred from  Universidad Católica
  Sebastián Cobelli Transferred from  Deportivo Pereira
   Hernán Madrid Transferred from  Universidad Católica
  Pablo Melgar Transferred from  CSD Municipal

Out:
  Oscar Malbernat Manager Out to  Coquimbo Unido
  Luis Flores Abarca Transferred to  Ñublense
  Gonzalo Klusener Transferred to  Defensa y Justicia
  Renato Ramos Transferred to  Tecos B
  Patricio Gutiérrez Transferred to  Unión La Calera

Audax Italiano

In:
  Braulio Leal Transferred from  Everton
  Rodolfo Moya Transferred from  La Serena
  Jorge Lema Transferred from  Coquimbo Unido
  Diego Scotti Transferred from  Montevideo Wanderers
  Víctor Loyola On Loan from  Santiago Morning
  Leonardo Medina On Loan from  Chiapas

Out:
  Gustavo Paruolo Transferred to  Politehnica lasi
  Luis Marin Transferred to  Lota Schwager
  Mauricio Rojas Transferred to  Cobresal
  Jaime Gonzalez Transferred to  Huachipato
  Aristides Masi Retired

Cobreloa

In:
  Esteban Paredes On Loan from  Santiago Morning
  Victor Osorio Transferred from  Coquimbo Unido
  Jean Beausejour Transferred from  KAA Gent
  Luis Godoy Transferred from  Antofagasta
  Rodrigo Perez Returns from  Alianza Lima
  Pablo Bolados Transferred from  La Serena
  Jhon Novoa Transferred from  Alianza de El Salvador
  Cristian Rios Transferred from  Club Almagro

Out:
  Mauricio Aros Transferred to  Universidad de Concepción
  Daniel Fernandez Transferred to  Coquimbo Unido
  Iván Vásquez Returns to  Universidad Católica
  Boris Gonzalez Transferred to  Colo-Colo
  Sebastián Pinto Returns to  Universidad de Chile
  Albert Acevedo Returns to  Universidad Católica
  Germán Navea Transferred to  Coquimbo Unido

Cobresal

In:
  Sebastián Aset Transferred from  Cooma Tigers FC
  Gabriel Varagas Transferred from  Puerto Montt
  Mauricio Rojas Transferred from  Audax Italiano
  Rodrigo Jara Transferred from  Universidad de Chile
  Edison Fonseca Transferred from  Deportes Tolima
  Roberto González Transferred from  O'Higgins
  Fernando Savio Transferred from  Rentistas
  Alejandro Blanco Transferred from  Curicó Unido
  Luis Mori Transferred from  O'Higgins
  Marcelo Medina Transferred from  O'Higgins
  Fabián Acuña Transferred from  La Serena
  Baltazar Astorga Transferred from  O'Higgins

Out:
  Elthon Troncoso Transferred to  Temuco
  Manuel Ibarra Transferred to  Unión Española
  Mauricio Tampe Transferred to  Santiago Wanderers
  Jose Daniel Contreras Transferred to  Coquimbo Unido
  Rodrigo Barra Transferred to  Ñublense
  Raúl Celis Sanzotti Transferred to  Deportes Concepción
  Claudio Videla Transferred to  Rangers
  Nelson Arriaza Transferred to  Municipal Iquique

Colo-Colo

In:
  Rainer Wirth Signed from  Universidad Católica
  Gilberto Velázquez Transferred from  Club Guaraní
  Rodrigo Millar Transferred from  Huachipato
  Giovanni Hernandez Comes from  Colón de Santa Fe
  Boris Gonzalez Transferred from  Cobreloa
  Edison Gimenez Transferred from  Club 2 de Mayo
  Gonzalo Jara Transferred from  Huachipato
  Juan Gonzalo Lorca On Loan from  Huachipato

Out:
  Matías Fernández Transferred to  Villarreal CF
  Miguel Caneo Returns to  Godoy Cruz
  Alex Varas Transferred to  Universidad de Concepción
  Andrés González Returns to  América de Cali
  Alvaro Ormeño Transferred to  Gimnasia LP
  Mario Caceres Transferred to  PAS Giannena
  Felipe Flores On Loan to  Club Deportivo O'Higgins
  Cristobal Jorquera On Loan to  Ñublense

Coquimbo Unido

In:
  Daniel Fernandez Transferred from  Cobreloa
  Felipe Flores Transferred from  La Serena
  Rodrigo Paillaqueo Transferred from  Colo-Colo
  Johnathan Cisternas Transferred from  Universidad de Chile
  Germán Navea Transferred from  Cobreloa
  Rodrigo Naranjo Transferred from  Everton
  Jose Daniel Contreras Transferred from  Cobresal

Out:
  Rodrigo Rivera Transferred to  Universidad de Chile
  Gamadiel García Transferred to  Skoda Xanthi
  Gustavo Lorenzetti Transferred to  Universidad de Concepción
  Carmelo Vega Transferred to  Puerto Montt
  Felipe Muñoz Transferred to  Universidad de Concepción
  Gonzalo Garavano Transferred to  Deportivo Italia
  Crsitian Leiva Transferred to  Huachipato

Deportes Concepción

In:
  Raúl Celis Sanzotti Transferred from  Cobresal
  Luis Chavarría Transferred from  Huachipato
  Miguel Ayala Transferred from  Rangers
  César Rodriguez Transferred from  Lota Schwager
  Jaison Ibarrola Transferred from  Nacional
  César Rodriguez Transferred from  Lota Schwager
  Mauricio Lagos Transferred from  Lota Schwager
  Raul Roman Transferred from  Tacuary FC

Out:

Everton

In:
  Jaime Rubilar Transferred from  Universidad Católica
  Diego Martín Guidi Signed from  O'Higgins
  Daniel Pérez Transferred from  Palestino
  Fernando López Transferred from  Palestino
  Joel Reyes Signed from  Unión Española
  Matías Urbano Transferred from  La Serena
  Gustavo Dalssaso Transferred from  Rangers
  Nicolás Núñez On Loan from  Universidad Católica
  Fernando Martel Signed from  Alianza Lima
  Juan José Ribera On Loan from  Universidad de Concepción
  Johnny Herrera Transferred from  Corinthians
  Marco Olea Signed from  O'Higgins
  Pedro Rivera Transferred from  Universidad de Concepción
  Rodrigo Raín On Loan from  Universidad de Concepción
  Felipe Soto Transferred from  O'Higgins

Out:
  Carlos San Martín Transferred to  La Plata FC
  Emilio Hernandez Returns to  Universidad de Chile
  Frank Carilao Transferred to  La Serena
  Roberto Castillo Transferred to  Antofagasta
  Juan Ramon Perez Transferred to  Expreso Rojo
  Marco Estrada Transferred to  Universidad de Chile
  Joel Estay Transferred to  La Serena
  Rodrigo Naranjo Transferred to  Coquimbo Unido

La Serena

In:
  Emmanuel Culio Transferred from  Racing Club
  Angel Carreño Transferred from  Palestino
  Joel Estay Transferred from  Everton
  Gustavo Canales Transferred from  Palestino
  Frank Carilao Transferred from  Everton
  Gastón Losa Transferred from  Deportivo Español
  Juan Quiroga Transferred from  Cobresal

Out:
  Carlos Asprilla Retired
  Felipe Flores Transferred to  Coquimbo Unido
  Carlos Tejas Transferred to  O'Higgins
  Matías Urbano Transferred to  Everton
  Yerson Opazo Returns to  Universidad de Chile
  Rodolfo Moya Transferred to  Audax Italiano
  Pablo Bolados Transferred to  Cobreloa

Unión Española

In:
  Manuel Ibarra Transferred from  Cobresal
  Sergio Gioino Transferred from  Universidad de Chile
  Hector Suazo Transferred from  Universidad de Chile
  Crsitian Limenza Transferred from  Lota Schwager
  Alejandro Acosta Transferred from  O'Higgins
  Johan Fuentes Transferred from  Melipilla
  Ruben Bascuñan Transferred from  Antofagasta
  Claudio Calderon Transferred from  Ñublense

Out:
  Manuel Neira Transferred to  Hapoel Tel Aviv
  Francis Ferrero Transferred to  Santiago Morning
  Juan Pablo Toro Transferred to  Universidad de Concepción
  Pedro Reyes Transferred to  Antofagasta
  Patricio Almendra Signed to  Curico Unido
  Luis Jara Returns to  Universidad Católica
  Francisco Rojas Transferred to  La Serena
  Julio César Gaona Released
  Roberto Ordenes Transferred to  Universidad de Concepción
  Joel Reyes Transferred to  Everton
  Raúl Arenas Released

Universidad Católica

In:
  Iván Vásquez Returns from  Cobreloa
  Albert Acevedo Returns from  Cobreloa
  Willy Topp Returns from  Puerto Monnt
  Cristián Álvarez Transferred from  River Plate
  Esteban Fuertes Comes from  Colón
  Rodrigo Valenzuela Transferred from  Universidad de Chile
  Patricio Ormazabal Transferred from  Universidad de Chile
  Hugo Morales Transferred from  Millonarios

Out:
  Francisco Arrué Back to  Universidad de Chile
  Juan Manuel Arostegui Transferred to  Salernitana Calcio 1919
  Alejandro Osorio Transferred to  Antofagasta
  Alejandro Gaete On Loan to  Coquimbo Unido
  Patricio Aguilera On Loan to  Antofagasta
  Johnathan Fabbro Transferred to  Club Guaraní

Universidad de Chile

In:
  Yerson Opazo Returns to  La Serena
  Mauricio Pinilla Transferred from  Sporting Lisboa
  Sebastián Pinto Returns from  Cobreloa
  Emilio Hernandez Returns from  Everton
  Patricio Galaz Comes from  Atlante F.C.
  Joel Soto Transferred from  O'Higgins
  Francisco Arrué Signed from  Universidad Católica
  Jorge Acuna Transferred from  RBC Roosendaal
  Federico Martorell Transferred from  Coronel Bolognesi
  Marco Estrada Transferred from  Everton
  José Manuel Rojas Transferred from  CA Independiente
  José Luis García On Loan from  Monarcas Morelia

Out:
  Marcelo Salas Retired
  Luis Pedro Figueroa Transferred to  Arsenal de Sarandí
  Rodrigo Jara On Loan to  Cobresal
  Nicolás Toro On Loan to  Cobresal
  Hector Suazo Transferred to  Unión Española
  Rodrigo Valenzuela Transferred to  Universidad Católica
  Nicolás Sartori Transferred to  Club Jorge Wilstermann
  Patricio Ormazabal Transferred to  Universidad Católica
  Rodrigo Astudillo Transferred to  America (RN)
  Sergio Gioino Transferred to  Unión Española

Clausura

Audax Italiano
In:
  Patricio Gutiérrez from  Unión La Calera
  Nicolás Corvetto from  Coquimbo Unido

Out:
  Jorge Carrasco Chirino to  Colo Colo
  Rodolfo Moya from  Colo Colo
  Roberto Cereceda from  Colo Colo

Colo Colo
In:
  Cristián Muñoz from  Huachipato
  Jorge Carrasco Chirino from  Audax Italiano
  Rodolfo Moya from  Audax Italiano
  Roberto Cereceda from  Audax Italiano
  Jose Luis Cabion from  Deportes Melipilla
  Miguel Aceval from  O'Higgins (Loan return)
  Eduardo Rubio from  Cruz Azul (On Loan)
  Claudio Bieler from  Atlético Rafaela
  Gustavo Biscayzacu from  CF Atlante

Out:
  Humberto Suazo to  CF Monterrey
  Alexis Sánchez to  Udinese Calcio
  Arturo Vidal to  Bayer 04
  Sebastian Cejas to  Gimnasia LP
  Jose Luis Jerez to  Panserraikos
  Edison Giménez to  Olimpia Asunción
  Gilberto Velázquez to  Olimpia Asunción

Everton
In
 Alejandro Escalona from  Náutico
 Juan Esteban Godoy from  Rubio Ñú
 Patricio Pérez from  Chacarita Juniors
 Michael Barrientos from  Santiago Wanderers
 Anastacio Vera from  Libertad
 Roberto Reyes from  O'Higgins
Out
 Juan José Ribera to  Universidad de Concepción
 Rodrigo Raín to  Cobreloa
 Pedro Rivera to  Coquimbo Unido
 Nicolás Núñez to  Universidad Católica (End of Loan)
 Fernando Martel to  Atlético Nacional
 Álvaro Villalón to  Lobos BUAP
 Daniel Pérez to  Guillermo Brown
 Fernando López to  O'Higgins

Huachipato
In
  Iván Herrera from  Rangers de Talca
  Ignacio Don from  Club Nacional
  Herminio Miranda from  2 de Mayo
  Alexis Delgado from  Villarreal B
  Juan Abarca from  Villarreal B
Out
  Manuel Faundez to  Deportes Valdivia
  Cristián Muñoz to  Colo Colo
  Pedro Morales to  Universidad de Chile
  Nicolás Núñez to  Universidad Católica (End of Loan)

Deportes Concepción
In:
 Patricio Almendra from  Curicó Unido
 Clarence Acuña from  Unión Española
 Alonso Zúñiga from  Antofagasta
 Leonardo Monje from  Universidad de Concepción
 Alejandro Osorio from  Antofagasta
 Sebastián Montecinos from  Puerto Montt

Out:
 Raúl Román to  Nacional (End of Loan)
 Nestor Contreras to  San Luis Quillota
 Miguel Angel Ayala to  Municipal Iquique
 José Florentino Inostroza to  Deportivo Temuco

Transfers
2007